Bahwartah (also spelled Bhorta or Bahirta) is a Turkmen village in northern Aleppo Governorate, northwestern Syria.

Administratively the village belongs to Nahiya Akhtarin in A'zaz District. Nearby localities include Shuwayrin  to the northwest, and Ziadiyah  to the southeast. In the 2004 census, Bahwartah had a population of 754.

References

Populated places in Azaz District
Turkmen communities in Syria